Les Précieuses ridicules (The Absurd Précieuses or The Affected Ladies) is a one-act satire by Molière in prose. It takes aim at the précieuses, the ultra-witty ladies who indulged in lively conversations, word games and, in a word, préciosité (preciousness).

Les Précieuses ridicules is a biting comedy of manners that brought Molière and his company to the attention of Parisians, after they had toured the provinces for years. The play received its Paris premiere on 18 November 1659 at the Théâtre du Petit-Bourbon. It seems not to have been staged before that in the provinces. It was highly successful and attracted the patronage of Louis XIV to Molière and company. Les Précieuses ridicules still plays well today.

Plot
Magdelon and Cathos are the aspiring précieuses, two young women from the provinces who have come to Paris in search of love and jeux d'esprit.

Gorgibus, the father of Magdelon and uncle of Cathos, decides they should marry a pair of eminently eligible young men but the two women find the men unrefined and ridicule them. The men vow to take revenge on les précieuses.

On stage comes Mascarille, a young man who pretends to be a sophisticated man of the world. Magdelon falls in love with him. Next on stage comes another young man, Jodelet, with whom Cathos falls in love.

It is revealed that these two men, Mascarille and Jodelet, are impostors whose real identities are as the valets of the first two men who were scorned and rejected.

As the curtain falls, Gorgibus and les précieuses are ashamed at having fallen for the trick. In the provinces, the young ladies' Parisian pretensions attracted mockery, while in Paris, their puffed-up provincial naiveté and self-esteem proved laughable.

Characters
La Grange (orig. played by La Grange) — one of the rejected suitors
Du Croisy (orig. played by Du Croisy) — the other rejected suitor
Gorgibus (orig. François Bedeau, aka L'Espy) — a good bourgeois man
Magdelon (orig. Madeleine Béjart) — daughter of Gorgibus and one of the précieuses ridicules
Cathos (orig. Mlle de Brie) — niece of Gorgibus and the other of the précieuses ridicules 
Marotte (orig. Marotte) — female servant of the précieuses ridicules 
Almanzor (orig. De Brie) — male lackey of the précieuses ridicules
"Marquis" de Mascarille (orig. Molière) — the valet of La Grange
"Vicomte" de Jodelet (orig. Jodelet) — the valet of Du Croisy
Two chair porters (orig. La Grange and Du Croisy)
Neighbors

The role of the Marquis de Mascarille was originally played by Molière himself while the role of Magdelon was first played by Madeleine Béjart.

Operatic adaptation
Composer Felice Lattuada and librettist Arturo Rossato wrote a commedia lirica based on the text, entitled Le preziose ridicole. It was premiered at Teatro alla Scala, Milan, on February 9, 1929.

Notes

External links
Les Précieuses ridicules, the original French text of the play by Molière.
The Pretentious Young Ladies, English translation of Les Précieuses ridicules by Henri Van Laun published in 1880 by R. Worthington, New York.

Plays by Molière
1659 plays
Satirical plays
Plays adapted into operas